Félix Montoya Ordóñez (born 28 March 1980 in Guanacaste Province) is a retired Costa Rican professional footballer.

Club career
A much-travelled midfielder, Montoya came through the Saprissa youth system and played one season for them, then played for hometown club Liberia Mia, Herediano, Puntarenas and again Herediano whom he left in 2010 after the club wouldn't meet his financial demands.

He then moved to San Carlos and Cartaginés, by whom he was released in March 2014. He subsequently joined Pérez Zeledón before the 2014 Invierno season.

International career
Montoya has made 5 appearances for the senior Costa Rica national football team, his debut coming in a friendly against Trinidad & Tobago on February 4, 2007. He appeared in three matches as Costa Rica won the UNCAF Nations Cup 2007 tournament.

References

External links
 
 Profile - Pérez Zeledón
 Profile at Nacion 

1980 births
Living people
People from Guanacaste Province
Association football midfielders
Costa Rican footballers
Costa Rica international footballers
Deportivo Saprissa players
Municipal Liberia footballers
Puntarenas F.C. players
C.S. Herediano footballers
A.D. San Carlos footballers
C.S. Cartaginés players
A.D. Carmelita footballers
Municipal Pérez Zeledón footballers
2007 UNCAF Nations Cup players
Copa Centroamericana-winning players